Nous aurons toute la mort pour dormir (We will have all death to sleep), is a 1977 Franco–Mauritanian documentary film directed by Med Hondo and produced for Les Films du Soleil Ô.

The film was shot for 4 months from December 25, 1975 to March 5, 1976, in the area of the former Spanish Sahara. The film deals with the armed struggle of Polisario Front in Western Sahara against Spain colonization. The film received positive reviews from critics and was screened at Berlin International Film Festival of West Germany in June 1977.

References

External links
 
 Gambia: Take Me To Learn My Roots on YouTube
 PERSPECTIVES CINÉMA FRANÇAIS

1977 films
Mauritanian documentary films
1970s French-language films
1977 documentary films
French documentary films
1970s French films